The Gen. John Stark House is a historic house museum at 2000 Elm Street in Manchester, New Hampshire.  The house, a single-story Cape style farmhouse, was built in 1736 by Archibald Stark.  Stark's son John, a hero of the American Revolutionary War, lived in this house from 1736 to 1765; it is where he brought his new bride Molly, and where two of their children were born.  It was listed on the National Register of Historic Places in 1973.  It is now operated as a museum by the local chapter of the Daughters of the American Revolution.

Description and history
The General John Stark House is located north of downtown Manchester, at the southwest corner of Elm and Waldo Streets.  It is a -story wood-frame structure, with a gabled roof, central chimney, and clapboarded exterior.  A single-story ell extends to the rear, giving the house an overall L shape.  The main facade is five bays wide, with a center entrance topped by a multilight transom window, and nine-over-six windows in the flanking bays.  The interior follows a typical center-chimney plan, with a narrow entrance vestibule and  parlors on either side of the chimney.  The kitchen extends across much of the back, with small chambers in the corners, with the stairway to the attic in the northwest corner.

The house was built on the  farm of Archibald Stark in 1736, and is where his family was raised.  Originally located on Canal Street, the house remained in the Stark family until 1821.  It was acquired by the Amoskeag Manufacturing Company in 1835, and used for worker housing.  In 1937 the company donated the building to the local chapter of the Daughters of the American Revolution, which restored the property and adapted it for use as a meeting site.  It was moved to its present site, which is also part of the Stark farm, in 1968.

See also
Stark Park
National Register of Historic Places listings in Hillsborough County, New Hampshire

References

Houses on the National Register of Historic Places in New Hampshire
Houses completed in 1736
Houses in Manchester, New Hampshire
Museums in Manchester, New Hampshire
Historic house museums in New Hampshire
Historical societies in New Hampshire
National Register of Historic Places in Manchester, New Hampshire